Antônio Alberto Guimarães Rezende (March 3, 1926 – April 13, 2015) was a Catholic bishop.

Ordained to the priesthood in 1953, Guimarãres Rezende was named bishop of the Diocese of Caetité, Brazil in 1982 and retired in 2002.

Notes

1926 births
2015 deaths
20th-century Roman Catholic bishops in Brazil
People from Uberaba
Roman Catholic bishops of Caetité